Coca-Cola Beverages Africa is a company that was formed in 2014 from the merger of SABMiller plc, The Coca-Cola Company and Gutsche Family Investments beverage bottling operations in Southern and East Africa.

Overview
On 27 November 2014, SABMiller plc, The Coca-Cola Company and GFI (controlling 80% of Coca-Cola South African Bottling Company (Sabco) ) announced they had come to terms on a merger. The merger would be executed in two phases. The first phase took 6–9 months, and the second would commence after the completion of the first phase, and last for around 12–18 months. The merger deal made Coca-Cola Beverages Africa the largest bottler in Africa and the 10th largest in the world, with annual revenue of US$3 billion. Coca-Cola Beverages Africa serves 12 countries, employs 12,000 people and accounts for 40 per cent of the total Coca-Cola beverage volume consumed in Africa. The merged business has its head office in South Africa.

Merger

Merger Parties

SABMiller
SABMiller plc is a multinational brewing and beverage company headquartered in London, England with its primary listing on the London Stock Exchange and a secondary Listing on the Johannesburg Stock Exchange. It is the world's second-largest brewer measured by revenues (after the Belgian-Brazilian Anheuser-Busch InBev) and is also the largest bottler of Coca-Cola in Africa.

The Coca-Cola Company
The Coca-Cola Company is a multinational beverage corporation headquartered in Atlanta, Georgia. Its stock is listed on the NYSE. The company is best known for its flagship product Coca-Cola, invented in 1886 by pharmacist John Stith Pemberton in Columbus, Georgia.

Coca-Cola Sabco
Coca-Cola Sabco is the second largest Coca-Cola bottler in Africa (after SABMiller) and has been a Coca-Cola bottler since 1940. The firm is 80% owned by Gutsche Family Investments and its headquarters are in Port Elizabeth, South Africa. Coca-Cola Sabco grew rapidly through a series of acquisition across Africa. Coca-Cola Sabco has over 8,000 employees and operates in South Africa, Namibia, Mozambique, Kenya, Tanzania, Ethiopia and Uganda.

Merger Details
The Merger of the three parties' operations was through a cashless transaction. The process was done in two phases:

Phase I
During the first phase the parties will contribute their business interests to Coca-Cola Beverages Africa as follows:
 SABMiller will contribute its entire Coca-Cola bottling franchise and non-alcoholic beverage businesses in Comoros, Ethiopia, Kenya, Mayotte, South Africa and Uganda to Coca-Cola Beverages Africa.
 GFI will contribute its entire 80% shareholding in Coca-Cola Sabco giving Coca-Cola Beverages Africa access to bottlers in Ethiopia, Kenya, Mozambique, Namibia, Tanzania and Uganda.
 The Coca-Cola Company will contribute its South Africa based bottles businesses.

Phase I will give Coca-Cola Beverages Africa access to nine countries i.e. South Africa, Kenya, Ethiopia, Mozambique, Tanzania, Uganda, Namibia, Comoros and Mayotte and is expected to be completed within 6–9 months.

Phase II
SABMiller will contribute to Coca-Cola Beverages Africa its soft drinks bottling businesses of Swaziland Beverages Ltd (now Eswatini Beverages) in Eswatini, Sechaba Brewery Holdings and Zambian Breweries Plc that are listed subsidiaries on the Botswana and Zambia Stock Exchange respectively.

Phase II is expected to be completed within 18 months after the completion of Phase I due to the regulatory and shareholder approvals. At the conclusion of Phase II, Coca-Cola Beverages Africa will have presence in South Africa, Kenya, Ethiopia, Mozambique, Tanzania, Uganda, Namibia, Comoros, Mayotte, Eswatini, Botswana and Zambia.

Addition Deal 
In addition to the deal, The Coca-Cola Company agreed to acquire sparkling soft drink Appletiser brands globally, and buy or be licensed for a further 19 non-alcoholic names in Africa and Latin America from  SABMiller for about $260 million.

Shareholding after Merger
Upon conclusion of the merger, shareholding in the stock of Coca-Cola Beverages Africa's as follows:

Progress
As at 31 July 2015, the merger transaction was yet to be concluded. It had however received regulatory approval from the COMESA Competition commission.

Following its acquisition of SABMiller, Anheuser-Busch InBev announced that it would sell its 57% acquired state in Coca-Cola Beverages Africa to the Coca-Cola Company. This would give the Coca-Cola Company 68.3% stake in the merged business. The deal was valued at $3.15 billion and the Coca-Cola Company would hold onto the investment until it found a new owner.

See also
 SABMiller
 The Coca-Cola Company
 Coca-Cola European Partners

References

SABMiller
Coca-Cola bottlers
Manufacturing companies established in 2014
Multinational food companies
2014 establishments in Africa